Women for Golden Hill (German: Frauen für Golden Hill) is a 1938 German drama film directed by Erich Waschneck and starring Kirsten Heiberg, Viktor Staal and Elfie Mayerhofer. The fim's sets were designed by the art directors Gustav A. Knauer and Alexander Mügge. The all-male inhabitants of an Australian mining camp send off for some mail order brides from Sydney. Two men refuse to join in, but their friend secretly arranges for two wives for them. Unfortunately one of them proves to be his own abandoned wife, who takes up with him again. This means a love triangle develops between the two men around the remaining woman.

The film was shot at the Babelsberg Studio and on location at Kurische Nehrung in East Prussia, which stood in for Australia. The film premiered on 30 December in Frankfurt, but was not a major box office hit.

Cast

References

Bibliography 
 O'Brien, Mary-Elizabeth. Nazi Cinema as Enchantment: The Politics of Entertainment in the Third Reich. Camden House, 2006.

External links 
 

1938 films
1930s adventure drama films
German adventure drama films
Films of Nazi Germany
1930s German-language films
Films directed by Erich Waschneck
UFA GmbH films
Films set in Australia
Films shot in Germany
Films about mining
Films shot at Babelsberg Studios
German black-and-white films
1938 drama films
1930s German films